The Guam flycatcher (Myiagra freycineti), or Guam broadbill, is an extinct species of bird in the family Monarchidae formerly endemic to Guam.

Taxonomy and systematics 
Some authorities consider the Guam flycatcher to have been a subspecies of the Oceanic flycatcher. It has also been considered conspecific with the Pohnpei flycatcher and Palau flycatcher. Alternate names for the Guam flycatcher include Guam Myiagra, Guam Myiagra flycatcher, Marianne Islands flycatcher, Micronesian broadbill, and Micronesian Myiagra.

Description
The Guam flycatcher was a small bird measuring 5 inches (13 cm) long with different coloration for the males and females. Males were glossy blue-black above while females were brownish-gray. Both had white below and buff coloration on the breast. It had a wide bill with long “whiskers” which helped it locate its food.

Status
The bird was secretive and occurred mainly in limestone and ravine forests. Although common on Guam as recently as the early 1970s, the flycatcher's population went into a rapid decline due to predation by the brown tree snake, Boiga irregularis, which was accidentally introduced to the island in the 1940s. The last sighting of the flycatcher occurred in the Santa Rosa area in 1983.

Given the small size of the island, the complete absence of recent sightings, and the universal presence of the brown tree snake in the bird's former habitat, the Guam flycatcher is considered extinct.

References

Guam flycatcher
Birds of Guam
Extinct birds of Oceania
Bird extinctions since 1500
Guam flycatcher
Articles containing video clips
Taxonomy articles created by Polbot